Chisocheton cumingianus subsp. kinabaluensis is a subspecies of Chisocheton cumingianus. It is a tree in the Meliaceae family. The bark is grey-brown. The flowers are pale yellow to white. The tree is named for Mount Kinabalu in Malaysia's Sabah state. Its habitat is rain forests. C. cumingianus subsp. kinabaluensis is endemic to Borneo and known only from Sabah.

References

cumingianus subsp. kinabaluensis
Endemic flora of Borneo
Trees of Borneo
Flora of Sabah
Plant subspecies
Plants described in 1922